Samnyeon Sanseong Fortress (literally "Three-Years' Mountain Fortress") is the ruins of a Silla fortress and wall that was built beginning in the year 470. The fortress was reconstructed in 486. The ruins are located in present-day Boeun, South Korea.  During the Three Kingdoms Period the town of Boeun-eup, located two kilometers from the fortress, was known as Samnyeon-gun or Samnyeonsan-gun and it is believed by some that the fortress gets its name from the town.  However, the Samguk Sagi relates that the fortress was completed in three years (Korean, sam nyeon), and that the fortress derived its name from this fact.  This account also suggests that the nearby town derived its name from the fortress, rather than vice versa.  The Annals of Joseon Dynasty show that the fortress was known as Ojeong Sanseong Fortress and was used during the Joseon Dynasty, probably because the fortress is located atop Mount Ojeongsan.  

The fortress has been registered by the South Korean government on the tentative list of sites awaiting approval as a UNESCO World Heritage site.  Although parts of the old wall have survived to this day, it is undergoing a major reconstruction by the Korean government.  It is also listed as Korean Historic Site No.235. 

The walls of Samnyeon Sanseong Fortress measured over 1,680 meters or 1,880 meters in length, depending on the reference source.  They were built by alternating rows of slim and flat stones placed in horizontal and vertical layers.  This method of construction resulted in a very strong wall structure.  The walls of the fortress, built on vertical cliffs, combine to create an impenetrable wall which ranged from thirteen to twenty meters in height.  The width of the walls ranged from five to eight meters.  The walls of stone also incorporated ramparts of mounded earth.  Other notable features of the ruins include four gates, seven Ongseong (curved guard bastions), two sluice gates and five wells.  The four gates, located approximately equidistantly measure at about 4.5 meters in length.  The Ongseong, or guard posts, were placed in areas most vulnerable to attack and were 25 meters in circumference and 8.3 meters in height.  A large pond was once inside the fortress and was used as an important water source although only the outline of the pond remains today.  

The fortress is valuable because it shows what building techniques were employed by the Silla during the late fifth century.  Additionally, Samnyeon Sanseong Fortress exhibits the characteristics typical of a Korean mountain fortress.  There are two general classifications of Korean-style mountain fortress.  The Pokok style is a fortress which surrounds the valley while the Teimeui style is a fortress where the walls are built around the peaks of the mountain, sometimes described like a folding screen across the mountain.  This fortress follows the Teimeui tradition.

The fortress occupied and protected a strategic location and is credited with helping Silla to achieve the unification of Korea.  During the late seventh century, Silla used the fortress as a base to attack Baekje to the west while also preparing for advances against Goguryeo to the north.  The fortress was pivotal in securing the Han River Valley, the central part of the Korean peninsula.  The reputation of the fortress is such that it is said that Wanggeon, the first king of Goryeo, failed in his attempt to take the fortress 918.   Excavations in 1983 of artifacts from the Three Kingdoms period up to the Joseon Dynasty give clues as to when the fortress was occupied and used.  Thousands of tombs also surround the fortress.  Another notable feature of the fortress is the presence of engraved calligraphy on a boulder at its entrance, writing that has been attributed to Kim Saeng.

See also
 Doksan Fortress
 Silla
 Castles in Korea

References

External links
 Cultural Heritage: Samnyeon Sanseong
 Oriental Architecture: Samnyeon Sanseong Fortress
 World Heritage in Korea (pdf)

Silla
Castles in South Korea